Ashina Duzhi (r. 676–676) was a Qaghan of the Western Turkic Khaganate following the conquest of Tang dynasty.

Life 
His connection to other members of Ashina dynasty is unknown. He was appointed commander of Fuyan (匐延) area by Gaozong in 671, which was populated by Chumukun (処木昆部) tribes mostly. However, in 676 he proclaimed himself On Oq Qaghan or Shixing Khagan, entered alliance with Tibetans and invaded Anxi Protectorate.

However, the Tang retaliated and sent Pei Xingjian. His first act was to ask for escorting the Persian throne successor Narsieh to his homeland. Duzhi himself arrived to escort only to be captured by Pei and sent to Changan.

He was replaced by Wang Fangyi (王方翼). Narsieh was appointed to rule a castle formerly belonging to Khagan.

References 

7th-century Turkic people
Ashina house of the Turkic Empire
Göktürk khagans